Derangement syndrome may refer to:

 America derangement syndrome
 Bush derangement syndrome
 Clinton derangement syndrome
 Trump derangement syndrome
 McKenzie method § Derangement Syndrome